Xenomigia sordida is a moth of the family Notodontidae. It is found in Colombia.

References

Moths described in 1913
Notodontidae of South America